Diogenes heteropsammicola is a species of hermit crab discovered during samplings between 2012 and 2016 in the shallow waters of the Japanese Amami Islands. This D. heteropsammicola is strongly associated with the walking corals. This hermit crab species is unique due to the discovery that they use living, growing coral as a shell. The live in the inside of the coral and vary from other types of hermits. Crustaceans of this type commonly replace their shell as the organism grows in size, but D. heteropsammicola are the first of their kind to use solitary corals as a shell form. Heteropsammia and Heterocyathus are the two solitary corals that this hermit species has been observed as occupying. These two coral species are also used as a home by symbiotic sipunculans of the genus Aspidosiphon, which normally occupy the corals that the were previously occupied by crabs.

The discoverers of this species are Momoko Igawa and Makoto Kato of Kyoto University, Japan.

References

External links 

Diogenidae
Crustaceans of Japan
Crustaceans described in 2017